Balitoropsis zollingeri is a species of ray-finned fish in the genus Balitoropsis.

References

Fish of Thailand
Balitoridae
Fish described in 1853